FM1, FM 1 or FM-1 may refer to:

 Bell YFM-1 Airacuda, an American heavy fighter aircraft
 Farm to Market Road 1, a state-maintained highway in Texas
 FM1 (radio station), a radio station in the Philippines
 Front Mission, a tactical role-playing game
 General Motors FM-1 Wildcat, an American carrier-borne fighter aircraft
 Melsheimer FM-1, an American glider
 Socket FM1, an accelerated processing unit (APU) socket for AMD processors